Fabio De Gaspari (born 4 December 1966) is a retired javelin thrower from Italy.

Biography
He won a total number of nine national titles during his career. His mother, Giancarla Spagolla, was a javelin thrower as well. He competed at the 1983 and 1987 World Championships.

Achievements

National titles
Fabio De Gaspari  has won 9 times the individual national championship.
9 wins in Javelin throw (1987, 1988, 1989, 1990, 1991, 1992, 1993, 1996, 1997)

See also
 Italian all-time lists - Javelin throw

References

External links
 

1966 births
Living people
Italian male javelin throwers
Sportspeople from Padua
Athletics competitors of Fiamme Oro
World Athletics Championships athletes for Italy
Mediterranean Games silver medalists for Italy
Mediterranean Games medalists in athletics
Athletes (track and field) at the 1991 Mediterranean Games
Athletes (track and field) at the 1993 Mediterranean Games